M. Fred Bell Rental Cottage is a historic home located at Fulton, Callaway County, Missouri.  It was built between about 1893 and 1894, with additions designed by Fulton architect Morris Frederick Bell built about 1904.  It is a one-story, Queen Anne / Shingle Style frame cottage with a central hip roof with pinwheel projecting gables.  It was restored in the late-1990s.

The house was listed on the National Register of Historic Places in 1997.

References 

Houses on the National Register of Historic Places in Missouri
Queen Anne architecture in Missouri
Houses completed in 1894
Houses in Callaway County, Missouri
National Register of Historic Places in Callaway County, Missouri